Komsan Merndee is a Thai footballer who plays as a defensive midfielder.

References

External links

Living people
1993 births
Komsan Merndee
Komsan Merndee
Komsan Merndee
Komsan Merndee
Komsan Merndee
Association football midfielders
Komsan Merndee